Duden Park is a public park located in the municipality of Forest in Brussels, Belgium.

Duden Park is home to the historical football club, Royale Union Saint-Gilloise, with Joseph Marien Stadium being located to the west of the park near the lowest point, at  elevation. The park is adjacent to Forest Park to its north.

See also

 List of parks and gardens in Brussels

References

Notes

Parks in Brussels
Urban public parks
Forest, Belgium
Leopold II of Belgium